Thomas Durant was the Teller of the Receipt of the Exchequer from ca. 1362 to 1398. He was a servant to Richard II.

References

Year of birth missing
Year of death missing
14th-century English people